Bjorn Surrao is an Indian singer-songwriter, performer, music producer and actor. He initially gained fame for his vocals in the song "Master the Blaster" from the Tamil film Master (2021). The track went on to #1 on iTunes, Apple Music and Spotify listings with over 32 million views on YouTube. 

 He started acting with the film Naalu Peruku Nalladhuna Edhuvum Thappilla (2017).
Bjorn has an independent music band called "Franks got the Funk" 
After "Master the Blaster", Bjorn in collaboration with Arivu & Jigarthanda Music worked on a song for Think Music titled "Yenna Sonna" Chennai Super Kings Anthem.
 His acting gained widespread attention after his supporting comedy role in Doctor (2021). He also starred in Beast with Vijay.

Early life 
Bjorn was born in Chennai, Tamil Nadu, India. His father is a professor in literature and his mother a social work professional. He completed high school in A. M. M. Matriculation Higher Secondary School and his bachelor's degree in commerce from Loyola College. After this he studied music production in Dubai, on returning to Chennai he completed his master's degree in business administration while simultaneously pursuing his musical career. Bjorn, a self-taught musician, started playing the piano and guitar at the age of 11, he began writing songs at the age of 15. During his college days he formed two alternative bands ‘Franks Got The Funk' and ‘Circuit‘ both being well renowned in the college circuit as well as the music industry.

Filmography 
As composer

As singer

As actor

References

External links 

Loyola College, Chennai alumni
Living people
Musicians from Chennai
1992 births
Tamil film score composers
Indian male film score composers